Noam Gamon (born 8 March 1997) is an Israeli footballer who plays as a right defender for F.C. Dimona. Gamon played in all of Israel national youngest team's

Career

Early career
Gamon grew up in the youth division of Hapoel Be'er Sheva. On 16 August 2015, the 2015–16 season, while playing in the club youth team, made its debut in the Toto Cup, in a 0–0 loss to Maccabi Netanya at Netanya Stadium.

On July 30, 2016, the 2016–17 season, he made his second appearance in the Toto Cup final team, in a 5–0 win over Hapoel Ashkelon at Sala Stadium. Gamon was a partner in Hapoel Be'er Sheva win in the Toto Cup, having won 4–1 Ironi Kiryat Shmona at Netanya Stadium. In the league, he played in the club youth team. On January 31, 2017, the winter transfer window was loaned to Hapoel Afula from the Liga Leumit until the end of the season. On 6 February 2017 he made his debut in a 0–0 draw against Hapoel Acre at Acre Municipal Stadium. By the end of the season, Gamon had held 14 appearances in the Liga Leumit.

In the season of 2017–18 he was loaned to Hapoel Afula until the end of the season from the Liga Leumit. On 6 December 2017 he was a partner in Hapoel Afula win in the Toto Cup Leumit, following a 3–0 win over Hapoel Ramat Gan at Grundman Stadium. By the end of the season he had made 34 league appearances. In season 2018–19 Gamon was loaned to Hapoel Afula until the end of the season from the Liga Leumit. Gamon made 20 league appearances and three more appearances in the State Cup, helping Hapoel Afula finish at the top of the table.

On July 11, 2019, Gamon was loaned to Hapoel Kfar Saba from the Israeli Premier League.

Career statistics

Honours

Club
Hapoel Beer Sheva
 Israeli Premier League: 2015–16
 Israel Super Cup: 2016
 Toto Cup: 2016-17

Hapoel Afula
 Toto Cup Leumit : 2017–18

References

External links
Noam Gamon at Eurosport

1997 births
Living people
Israeli footballers
Israel youth international footballers
Hapoel Be'er Sheva F.C. players
Hapoel Afula F.C. players
Hapoel Kfar Saba F.C. players
Hapoel Ra'anana A.F.C. players
F.C. Dimona players
Liga Leumit players
Israeli Premier League players
Association football wingers
Association football forwards